The Swiss Women's Curling Championship is the national championship of women's curling in Switzerland. It has been held annually since 1964.

List of champions
*World champions in bold

*Alternates in italics

References

Swiss Curling Association Champions
Curling Schweizermeisterschaft - www.ccflims.ch - 3. bis 20. Februar 2016, Flims (at last page list of all Swiss curling champion teams: men's 1943—2015 and women's 1964—2015; before 2003 team line-ups shown in reverse order: alternate (if exists), lead, second, third, skip)
Erfolge des Curling Club Dübendorf

See also
Swiss Men's Curling Championship
Swiss Mixed Doubles Curling Championship
Swiss Mixed Curling Championship
Swiss Junior Curling Championships
Swiss Senior Curling Championships
Swiss Wheelchair Curling Championship

Curling competitions in Switzerland
 
National curling championships